Blackjack is an album by American trumpeter Donald Byrd featuring performances by Byrd with Sonny Red, Hank Mobley, Cedar Walton, Walter Booker, and Billy Higgins recorded in 1967 and released on the Blue Note label as BLP 4259. The CD reissue included one bonus track recorded in 1963. The title track was sampled by Gang Starr & Dream Warriors in their 1991 collaboration "I've Lost My Ignorance".

Reception
The Allmusic review by Scott Yanow awarded the album 3 stars and stated "One can sense that Byrd wanted to break through the boundaries and rules of hard bop but had not yet decided on his future directions".

Track listing
All compositions by Donald Byrd except as indicated

 "Blackjack" - 6:16
 "West of Pecos" (Sonny Red) - 5:29
 "Loki" (Red) - 5:53
 "Eldorado" (Mitch Farber) - 8:00
 "Beale Street" (Red) - 5:25
 "Pentatonic" - 4:59
 "All Members" (Heath) - 4:34 Bonus track on CD reissue

Recorded on May 27, 1963 (track 7) & January 9, 1967 (tracks 1-6).

Personnel
Tracks 1-6
Donald Byrd - trumpet
Sonny Red - alto saxophone
Hank Mobley - tenor saxophone
Cedar Walton - piano
Walter Booker - bass
Billy Higgins - drums

Track 7
Donald Byrd - trumpet
Sonny Red - alto saxophone
Jimmy Heath - tenor saxophone
Herbie Hancock - piano
Eddie Khan - bass
Albert Heath - drums

References

1968 albums
Albums recorded at Van Gelder Studio
Albums produced by Alfred Lion
Blue Note Records albums
Donald Byrd albums